The Northeast Corner Conference is an twelve-member Indiana High School Athletic Association (IHSAA)-sanctioned conference based in Northeast Indiana. Its schools are located within DeKalb, Elkhart, LaGrange, Noble, Steuben, and Whitley counties.

History

The conference was formed as the Bi-County Conference in 1964, as the formations of Lakeland and Prairie Heights left Lagrange and Steuben Counties with only seven schools total. Angola already competed in the Northeastern Indiana Athletic Conference, and Lakeland decided to compete independently. The five remaining schools started the conference, though Shipshewanna-Scott and Topeka were due to consolidate by 1966, while Fremont and Hamilton also participated in the State Corner Conference, while staying with their other Steuben County schools. Meanwhile, at that point the five remaining Noble County schools were set to consolidate into two schools themselves, and were also needing new conference affiliation. They joined with the Bi-County Conference teams, and changed their name to the current NECC. Howe Military also joined that year.

Other schools to join since then were Lakeland in 1974, Fairfield in 1980, Garrett in 1981, Eastside in 1983, and Angola and Churubusco in 1989. Howe Military left in 1980, and Garrett followed in 2005 (before rejoining in 2014).

Membership

 Fremont and Hamilton were concurrent members of the Bi-County and State Corner conferences from 1964 to 1967.
 Garrett was a member of the Allen County Athletic Conference from 2005 to 2014.

Former members

Football Divisions 
With Garrett returning to the conference, football will return to the divisional format used between 1989 and 2005. The divisions have always been labeled as Division I (small school) and Division II (large school).

Conference Champions 

(Note) These are LEAGUE champs from 1966–present

Football 

Howe (then Howe Military) left in 1980. Hamilton dropped football in 1986.

Boys Basketball

Girls Basketball

Boys Baseball 

No champion was crowned in 2020 due to the COVID-19 pandemic

Softball 

No champion was crowned in 2020 due to COVID-19 pandemic

Volleyball

Boys Tennis

Girls Tennis 

No champion was crowned in 2020 due to COVID-19 pandemic

Wrestling 
West noble 2006, 2007

Resources 
 IHSAA Conferences
 IHSAA Directory
 E.T. Pearl's Basketball Corner Data Catalogue

Indiana high school athletic conferences
High school sports conferences and leagues in the United States